Brathay is a parish in Cumbria, England.  Brathay Hall and the surrounding estate belong to a charity, Brathay Trust.

See also

Listed buildings in Skelwith

External links

Villages in Cumbria
South Lakeland District